De Bever or DeBever is a Dutch-language surname meaning "the beaver".
People with the name include:

Bas de Bever (1968), Dutch former professional Motocross (BMX) racer
Leo de Bever (1930–2015), Dutch architect
McKenna DeBever (1996), American-Peruvian swimmer

Surnames of Belgian origin
Dutch-language surnames
Surnames from nicknames